Osteocarpum is a genus of flowering plants belonging to the family Amaranthaceae.

Its native range is Australia.

Species
Species:

Osteocarpum acropterum 
Osteocarpum dipterocarpum 
Osteocarpum pentapterum 
Osteocarpum salsuginosum 
Osteocarpum scleropterum

References

Amaranthaceae
Amaranthaceae genera